Hamlet is a locality in Alberta, Canada.

The community has the name of William Hamlet, a railroad official.

References 

Localities in Wheatland County, Alberta